GFAP may refer to:
 Glial fibrillary acidic protein
 General Framework Agreement for Peace in Bosnia and Herzegovina, also known as the Dayton Agreement